Kathy McNeil may refer to:

 Kathy Wells-McNeil (born 1971/72), Canadian entrepreneur and political candidate
 Kate McNeil (born 1959), American actress